Mitromica solitaria is a species of small sea snail, marine gastropod mollusk in the family Costellariidae, the ribbed miters.

Description

Distribution

References

 Turner H. 2001. Katalog der Familie Costellariidae Macdonald, 1860. Conchbooks. 1-100-page(s): 60 
 Rosenberg, G. & Salisbury, R. 2003. On Mitromica and Thala (Gastropoda: Costellariidae) with descriptions of new species from the Western Atlantic and Indo-Pacific. Notulae Naturae 478: 1–30

Costellariidae
Gastropods described in 1852